Theresa Monique Plaisance (born May 18, 1992) is an American professional basketball player for the Seattle Storm of the Women's National Basketball Association (WNBA).

LSU statistics 
Source

WNBA career statistics

Regular season

|-
| style="text-align:left;"| 2014
| style="text-align:left;"| Tulsa
| 19 || 0 || 4.7 || .150 || .400 || 1.000 || 0.8 || 0.3 || 0.2 || 0.3 || 0.2 || 0.6
|-
| style="text-align:left;"| 2015
| style="text-align:left;"| Tulsa
| 25 || 1 || 8.2 || .281 || .320 || .700 || 1.9 || 0.2 || 0.2 || 0.2 || 0.1 || 1.9
|-
| style="text-align:left;"| 2016
| style="text-align:left;"| Dallas
| 27 || 1 || 11.9 || .398 || .333 || .636 || 2.5 || 0.3 || 0.3 || 0.4 || 0.7 || 4.0
|-
| style="text-align:left;"| 2017
| style="text-align:left;"| Dallas
| 34'' || 25 || 20.3 || .380 || .344 || .862 || 4.3 || 0.9 || 0.7 || 0.7 || 0.9 || 7.7|-
| style="text-align:left;"| 2018
| style="text-align:left;"| Dallas
| 7 || 0 || 11.6 || .389 || .474 || .000 || 3.7 || 0.7 || 0.3 || 0.3 || 1.1 || 5.3
|-
| style="text-align:left;"| 2019
| style="text-align:left;"| Dallas
| 22 || 12 || 17.2 || .374 || .343 || .773 || 4.4 || 1.5 || 0.3 || 0.8 || 1.4 || 6.0
|-
| style="text-align:left;"| 2019
| style="text-align:left;"| Connecticut
| 9 || 0 || 7.1 || .348 || .333 || 1.000 || 1.8 || 0.0 || 0.3 || 0.2 || 0.1 || 2.4
|-
| style="text-align:left;"| 2020
| style="text-align:left;"| Connecticut
| 13 || 0 || 6.9 || .379 || .294 || .833 || 1.0 || 0.1 || 0.4 || 0.2 || 0.2 || 2.5
|-
| style="text-align:left;"| 2021
| style="text-align:left;"| Washington
| 31 || 11 || 18.0 || .351 || .302 || .815 || 4.4 || 1.4 || 0.8 || 0.7 || 1.2 || 6.4
|-
|style="text-align:left;background:#afe6ba;"| 2022†
| style="text-align:left;"| Las Vegas
| 31 || 2 || 12.9 || .371 || .348 || .700 || 2.6 || 0.5 || 0.3 || 0.4 || 0.7 || 4.0
|-
| style='text-align:left;'| Career
| style='text-align:left;'| 9 years, 4 teams
| 218 || 52 || 13.2 || .363 || .337 || .784 || 3.0 || 0.7 || 0.4 || 0.5 || 0.7 || 4.5

Playoffs

|-
| style="text-align:left;"| 2015
| style="text-align:left;"| Tulsa
| 2 || 0 || 3.5 || .000 || .000 || .000 || 0.0 || 0.5 || 0.0 || 0.0 || 1.0 || 0.0
|-
| style="text-align:left;"| 2017
| style="text-align:left;"| Dallas
| 1 || 1 || 24.0 || .429 || .000 || 1.000 || 5.0 || 3.0 || 1.0 || 1.0 || 1.0 || 7.0 
|-
| style="text-align:left;"| 2019
| style="text-align:left;"| Connecticut
| 3|| 0 || 2.0 || .333 || .200 || .000 || 0.7 || 0.0 || 0.0 || 0.3 || 0.0 || 1.7
|-
| style="text-align:left;"| 2020
| style="text-align:left;"| Connecticut
| 3 || 0 || 4.0 || .000 || .000 || .000 || 0.7 || 0.3 || 0.0 || 0.7 || 0.0 || 0.0
|-
|style="text-align:left;background:#afe6ba;"| 2022†
| style="text-align:left;"| Las Vegas
| 4 || 0 || 5.0 || .400 || .333''' || .000 || 1.3 || 0.5 || 0.3 || 0.5 || 0.3 || 1.3
|-
| style='text-align:left;'| Career
| style='text-align:left;'| 5 years, 3 teams
| 13 || 1 || 5.3 || .318 || .154 || 1.000 || 1.1 || 0.5 || 0.2 || 0.4 || 0.6 || 1.3

Personal life
Plaisance has a dog. Her mother is the head coach of women's basketball at Nicholls State University in Thibodaux, Louisiana.

References

External links
Theresa Plaisance Basketball Player Profile, Tulsa Shock, LSU, News, WNBA stats, Career, Games Logs, Bests, Awards – usabasket.com
Theresa Plaisance – WNBA
LSU Lady Tigers bio

1992 births
Living people
American expatriate basketball people in China
American expatriate basketball people in Turkey
American women's basketball players
Basketball players from New Orleans
Centers (basketball)
Connecticut Sun players
Dallas Wings players
Las Vegas Aces players
LSU Lady Tigers basketball players
McDonald's High School All-Americans
Medalists at the 2013 Summer Universiade
Power forwards (basketball)
Tulsa Shock draft picks
Tulsa Shock players
Universiade gold medalists for the United States
Universiade medalists in basketball
Vandebilt Catholic High School alumni
Washington Mystics players